Boxyboy, Sōkoban World in Japan, is a puzzle video game released for the Turbografx-16 home video game console, published by NEC in 1990. This game is an adaptation of Sokoban, released on several home computers in the United States and Japan in the 1980s, including the NEC PC-8801 and IBM-PC and compatibles. In this game, the player must push crates or boxes around a warehouse, trying to get them to the proper storage location.

Gameplay 

In this game, the player takes control of a warehouse worker in a top-down view perspective on the warehouse floor. The player uses the direction pad on the controller to move the character in 4 directions. The goal of each stage is to get each box to the storage area, indicated by a dot on the screen, without getting boxes stuck against walls or other boxes. The player character can only push boxes forward and cannot pull boxes back. If the player makes a mistake, the action can be undone by pressing the II button the Turbopad controller. Holding the I button while pressing the directional pad will make the character move faster.

The game takes place across 5 worlds, each consisting of 20 stages. The worlds include America (stages 1-20), Egypt (stages 21-41), China (stages 41-60), South Pole (stages 61-80), and Japan (stages 81-100). However, there are also stages hidden throughout the game. In each world, the player takes control of a different character. 

When the player successfully completes a stage, a password is shown on screen. The player can replay each stage selecting "password" from the title screen and entering the stage's corresponding password.

This game also allows players to create their own warehouse puzzles in "Construction" mode. In this mode, the player can select walls, blocks, or other parts and organize them into a custom level. These custom levels can be saved, but due to storage limitations, only 3 stages can be saved at a time.

Also, if the player has a TurboGrafx-CD or TurboBooster-Plus, the player can save their progress at anytime after stage 20 to the backup memory in either of those accessories.

Development 
Sokoban was created in 1981 by Hiroyuki Imabayashi. The first commercial game was published in December 1982 by Thinking Rabbit, a software house based in Takarazuka, Japan. Due to the game's widespread success in Japan, the game was eventually ported to IBM-PC, Commodore 64, and Apple II computers in 1988 by Spectrum HoloByte. This game is one of many that NEC ported from their 8-bit line of home computers to the PC Engine in Japan under the name Sōkoban World. Eventually the game made its way to the Turbografx-16 in the United States under the name Boxyboy in 1990.

Reception 
One reviewer gave praise to this game's graphics and simplistic gameplay. However, he was critical of the games music, preferring to turn the music off. In the end this reviewer rated the game at 4 out of 10 as "something you can skip," citing that only thing players can do in this game is move boxes.

Retrogamer.net review Paul Driscoll recommended Boxyboy to puzzle game enthusiasts but theorized that other players would not enjoy this game.

The game currently has a 3 out of 5 star rating on GameFAQs, rating it at "Fair."

References 

Puzzle video games
TurboGrafx-16 games
TurboGrafx-16-only games
1990 video games
Video games developed in Japan